Anastas Kovachev (16 October 1910 – 11 December 1997) was a Bulgarian footballer. He played in eleven matches for the Bulgaria national football team from 1934 to 1937. He was also part of Bulgaria's team for their qualification matches for the 1938 FIFA World Cup.

References

External links
 

1910 births
1997 deaths
Bulgarian footballers
Bulgaria international footballers
Place of birth missing
Association footballers not categorized by position